Küçük Çamlıca TV Radio Tower, shortly Çamlıca Tower, is a telecommunications tower with observation decks and restaurants on Little Çamlıca Hill in Üsküdar district of Istanbul, Turkey.

With a total height of 587 m above sea level, it carries the title of the highest structure in Istanbul.

The structure was chosen by then prime minister Recep Tayyip Erdoğan after the Çamlıca Hill TV Radio Tower Idea Project, which was opened by Istanbul Metropolitan Municipality in 2011. Construction started in late 2016 and finished four years later in September 2020. However, the project was set to be completed by the end of 2019. It was inaugurated on May 29, 2021.

After the tower was put into service, other antennas and antenna towers such as Çamlıca TRT Television Tower were either removed or demolished.

Architectural Design
The tower is designed by Melike Altınışık Architects (MAA) firm, founded by Melike Altınışık after she left Zaha Hadid Architects. The building itself is a single piece structure, which was inspired by the Tulip flower; a symbol for the Turks during the Ottoman period. The main axis of the tower includes the roots and feeder stem of the tulip. The viewing terrace and restaurant floors resemble a tulip bud that hasn't bloomed yet.

Panoramic elevators rising from the ground floor to the top floor, are located on both sides of the main building. These elevators symbolize the Bosphorus, which both separates and integrates the Asian and European continents.

General Contractor 
The construction project was awarded to Saridaglar Construction following a public bidding procedure by the Turkish Ministry of Transport and Infrastructure. 

Saridaglar's scope included:

 Civil Works
 Construction Works
 Architectural Works
 MEP Works
 Landscaping Works.

This was one of the rare fast-track projects in Turkey. Due to the fast-track nature of the contract and complexity of construction methodologies, the project was subject to budget and schedule alterations.

Structure Specifications

It is the highest structure in Istanbul.

Two observation decks are situated on the 33rd and 34th floors at  height from sea level. The 39th and 40th floors at   height host a restaurant and a cafeteria. Libraries and exhibition halls are situated in the basement floors. A panoramic elevator and a service elevator serves the tower. 

Çamlıca Tower is capable of hosting 100 high-quality broadcasting transmitters, without interfering with one another. It is the very first TV and radio tower in the world that can broadcast 100 channels at the same time.

Technical Specifications

Project Cost
In the first bid held on December 31, 2014, the cost of the project was announced as 73.1 million US Dollars. However, due to the changing requirements of the building, 3 new bids were made; and the cost of the project was finalized at US$121.7 million (381.8 Million Turkish liras).

Gallery

See also
 Çamlıca TRT Television Tower
 Endem TV Tower

References

Communication towers in Turkey
Towers in Istanbul
Observation towers in Turkey
Restaurants in Istanbul
Tourist attractions in Istanbul
Üsküdar
Restaurant towers
Towers completed in 2021
2021 establishments in Turkey